Moskovka is the name of several rural localities in Russia:
Moskovka, Altai Krai, a settlement in Michurinsky Selsoviet of Khabarsky District of Altai Krai
Moskovka, Kemerovo Oblast, a settlement in Berikulskaya Rural Territory of Tisulsky District of Kemerovo Oblast
Moskovka, Krasnoyarsk Krai, a village in Stepnovsky Selsoviet of Nazarovsky District of Krasnoyarsk Krai
Moskovka, Dobrinsky District, Lipetsk Oblast, a village in Talitsky Selsoviet of Dobrinsky District of Lipetsk Oblast
Moskovka, Dryazginsky Selsoviet, Usmansky District, Lipetsk Oblast, a selo in Dryazginsky Selsoviet of Usmansky District of Lipetsk Oblast
Moskovka, Nikolsky Selsoviet, Usmansky District, Lipetsk Oblast, a village in Nikolsky Selsoviet of Usmansky District of Lipetsk Oblast
Moskovka, Republic of Mordovia, a selo in Khilkovsky Selsoviet of Torbeyevsky District of the Republic of Mordovia
Moskovka, Moscow Oblast, a village in Vasilyevskoye Rural Settlement of Serpukhovsky District of Moscow Oblast
Moskovka, Novosibirsk Oblast, a settlement in Ubinsky District of Novosibirsk Oblast
Moskovka, Ryazan Oblast, a village in Shelemishevsky Rural Okrug of Skopinsky District of Ryazan Oblast
Moskovka, Smolensk Oblast, a village in Pokrovskoye Rural Settlement of Gagarinsky District of Smolensk Oblast
Moskovka, Tver Oblast, a village in Mostovskoye Rural Settlement of Oleninsky District of Tver Oblast
Moskovka, Nizhnetavdinsky District, Tyumen Oblast, a village in Velizhansky Rural Okrug of Nizhnetavdinsky District of Tyumen Oblast
Moskovka, Sorokinsky District, Tyumen Oblast, a village in Alexandrovsky Rural Okrug of Sorokinsky District of Tyumen Oblast
Moskovka, Uporovsky District, Tyumen Oblast, a village in Skorodumsky Rural Okrug of Uporovsky District of Tyumen Oblast